Ekaterine Gorgodze (born 3 December 1991) is a Georgian professional tennis player.

Gorgodze has won two doubles titles on the WTA Tour and also four doubles titles on the WTA Challenger Tour along with 17 singles and 29 doubles titles on the ITF Women's Circuit. On 23 May 2022, she reached her best singles ranking of world No. 108. On 15 August 2022, she peaked at No. 43 in the doubles rankings.

Since her debut for Georgia Fed Cup team in 2007, Gorgodze has accumulated a win–loss record of 18–20.

Performance timeline

Singles
Current through the 2023 Australian Open.

Doubles

WTA career finals

Doubles: 3 (2 titles, 1 runner-up)

WTA Challenger finals

Doubles: 5 (4 titles, 1 runner-up)

ITF Circuit finals

Singles: 33 (17 titles, 16 runner–ups)

Doubles: 45 (29 titles, 15 runner–ups, 1 not played)

Notes

References

External links

 
 
 

1991 births
Living people
Female tennis players from Georgia (country)